Philip Lavery (born 17 August 1990, in Dublin) is an Irish racing cyclist who most recently rode for the  team. Lavery won the 2010 Tour of the North and won a bronze medal at the 2010 Commonwealth Games in India, as part of the Northern Irish team pursuit squad. During the summer of 2013, Lavery joined the  team as a stagiaire, after taking several victories in French domestic racing.

Major results

2013 – AC Bisontine
1st, Prix des Vallons in Schweighouse-sur-Moder
1st  Stage 1, Tour de Franche-Comté
1st, Le Souvenir Jean Lacroix
1st, Tour du Charolais
2nd, National Road Race Championships
2nd, Annemasse-Bellegarde

2012 – 
1st,  National Under-23 Road Race Championships (CN)
1st, Shay Elliott Memorial
1st, Stephen Roche GP
1st, Roy Thame Cup
3rd, National Road Race Championships (CN) (16 UCI Europe pts)

2011 – 
2nd, National Under-23 Road Race Championships (CN)
7th, National Road Race Championships (CN)

2010 –  (stagiaire)
1st overall, Tour of the North
1st Kruiseke Wevrik (1.12)
2nd, Lincoln Grand Prix
3rd, Commonwealth Games Team Pursuit (part of Northern Ireland team)
lapped India to win Bronze medal race
time of 4.22.669 in qualifying
with Martyn Irvine, Sean Downey and David McCann
11th, Commonwealth Games 1000m Time Trial

2009
3rd, National Under-23 Road Race Championships (CN)
7th, National Road Race Championships (CN)

2007
2nd, National Junior Road Race Championships (CN)

References

External links

An Post Sean Kelly Team website

Living people
Irish male cyclists
1990 births
Sportspeople from Dublin (city)
Commonwealth Games bronze medallists for Northern Ireland
Cyclists at the 2010 Commonwealth Games
Commonwealth Games medallists in cycling
Medallists at the 2010 Commonwealth Games